George Edward Lynch Cotton, Bishop of Calcutta (29 October 1813 – 6 October 1866) was an English educator and clergyman, known for his connections with British India and the public school system.

Life in England

He was born at Chester, a grandson of the late George Cotton, Dean of Chester. 

His father, Thomas George D'Avenant Cotton -- born in Acton, Cheshire, England on 28 June 1783 to George and Catherine Maria ( Tomkinson) Cotton -- was a captain in the Royal Fusiliers and died in the Peninsular War in 1813 at the Battle of Nivelle, two weeks after George's birth.
He received his education at The King's School, Chester, Westminster School, and at Trinity College, Cambridge. Here he joined the Low Church party, and was a close friend of several disciples of Thomas Arnold, including CJ Vaughan and WJ Conybeare. Arnold's influence determined the character and course of Cotton's life.

He graduated BA in 1836, and became an assistant master at Rugby School. He became master of the fifth form in about 1840. In 1852 he accepted the appointment of headmaster at Marlborough College, reviving its financial, educational and reputational status. Both Rugby School and Marlborough College boarding houses were subsequently named after him.

Cotton married his cousin, Sophia Ann Tomkinson, daughter of Rev. Henry Tomkinson and niece of T. J. Phillips Jodrell, on 26 June 1845. They had two children; a son, Edward Cotton-Jodrell (later MP for Wirral) and a daughter, Ursula Mary, who also married within the clergy.

India
In 1858 Cotton was offered the office of the Bishop of Calcutta, which, after much hesitation, he accepted. The government of India had just been transferred from the British East India Company to the crown, and questions of education were eagerly discussed, following Macaulay's famous Minute on Indian Education.

Cotton established schools for British and Eurasian children including the Bishop Cotton School Shimla. The Bishop Cotton Boys' School and Bishop Cotton Girls' School in Bangalore were established in his memory. The Bishop Cotton School in Nagpur also bears his name. He founded many other schools in India, including St. James' School in Calcutta, and Cathedral and John Connon in Bombay.

As the senior Anglican prelate in India, he also consecrated a number of new churches throughout the subcontinent, including St. Luke's Church, Abbottabad, and others on what then used to be the Punjab Province and later became the North West Frontier Province.

A memoir of his life with selections from his journals and correspondence, edited by his widow, was published in 1871.

Death
On 6 October 1866, he had consecrated a cemetery at Kushtia on the Ganges in the then Bengal Presidency, and was crossing a plank leading from the bank to the steamer when he slipped and fell into the river Gorai. He was carried away by the current and never seen again.

The phrase "to bless one's cotton socks" is traceable to Cotton's death. While Bishop of Calcutta, Cotton ensured that children in his schools had socks to wear, and he blessed the socks upon their arrival, as he did other goods. Over time, "Cotton's socks" became "Cotton socks". Upon his sudden death, the Archbishop was asked, "Who will bless his cotton socks".

Bibliography

References

Attribution:

External links
Bibliographic directory from Project Canterbury

1813 births
1866 deaths
Alumni of Trinity College, Cambridge
People educated at Westminster School, London
Founders of Indian schools and colleges
Deaths by drowning in India
People educated at The King's School, Chester
Anglican bishops of Calcutta
Masters of Marlborough College
Anglican bishops of West Malaysia